Fishnet is hosiery with an open, diamond-shaped knit used as a material for stockings, tights or bodystockings.

Fishnet or fish net may also refer to:

 Fishnet, a vernacular name for the lichen Ramalina menziesii
 Fish net, a net used for fishing
 "Fishnet" (song), a 1988 single by Morris Day
 Fishnet (novel), a 2015 novel by Kirstin Innes

See also
 FishNet Security, an information security company
 Fish (disambiguation)
 Net (disambiguation)